Money Back Guarantee is an upcoming Pakistani action comedy film film directed and written by Faisal Qureshi (in his feature directorial debut). The film features an ensemble cast featuring Fawad Khan, Hina Dilpazir, Ali Safina, Wasim Akram, Shayan Khan, Mikaal Zulfiqar, Gohar Rasheed, and Jan Rambo. The film was scheduled for release on 22 May 2020. However, due to the COVID-19 pandemic, the movie release was postponed. The film's musical score is composed by Tyler Westen.

The film is scheduled to be released worldwide on 21 April 2023.

Synopsis
Note: The creators have kept the film's plot a secret, but from the trailers we can assume that the film is about a group of people who plan a money heist to pay off their debts while a bank manager tries to get his bank's money back from the same criminals in time for an election.

Cast
The complete cast is:
Fawad Khan
Hina Dilpazir
Jan Rambo
Ayesha Omar
Wasim Akram
Shaniera Akram
Mikaal Zulfiqar
Ali Safina
Gohar Rasheed
Kiran Malik
Aqdas Waseem
Mani
Marhoom Ahmad Bilal
Adnan Jaffar
Shayan Khan
Javed Sheikh
 Ali Rehman Khan
 Ahsan Rahim
 Faysal Quraishi
 Faisal Qureshi
 Hajra Yamin
 Muniba Mazari
 George Fulton
 Mubeen Gabol
 Shafaat Ali
 Syeda Marium Batool
 Khadija Arshad
 Ataullah Jan
 Ukasha Gul
 Waheed Khan Lala

Filming

The filming took place in the end of 2019. The film has been shot in Karachi, while some parts have been shot in Thailand. The filming of the film, along with the soundtrack, was completed within 40 days.

Release 
On 6 September 2022, it was announced that film will be released worldwide on 21 April 2023. The official teaser was released on 9 September 2022.

Music 
The soundtract for the movie was composed by Tyler Westen, a Hollywood music composer. The songs are written by Shani Arshad, a Pakistani film music director and songwriter and Asfar Hussain, the lead vocalist of Bayaan. The movie features three songs which were recorded in Karachi, Lahore and New York.

References

External links
 
 Zashko Films

Upcoming films
Unreleased Pakistani films
Pakistani action films
2020s Urdu-language films
Films directed by Faisal Qureshi (television personality)
Films postponed due to the COVID-19 pandemic
Urdu-language Pakistani films